Abdelali Lahrichi (born 19 July 1993) is a Moroccan professional basketball player who plays for AS Salé of the Division Excellence. 

After starting his career with Wydad AC, and he joined ami (assosiation michlifen ifrane) he joined Cergy-Pontoise in 2020. After one season with Kawkab Atletic Club de Marrakech, he joined AS Salé for the 2022 BAL Playoffs.

He represented Morocco's national basketball team at the 2017 AfroBasket in Tunisia and Senegal, where he recorded most steals for Morocco.

References

External links
 FIBA profile
 Real GM profile
 Afrobasket.com profile

1993 births
AS Salé (basketball) players
Living people
Moroccan men's basketball players
Place of birth missing (living people)
Shooting guards
Small forwards
Sportspeople from Casablanca